Calendar Girl is a 1947 American musical-romance film directed by Allan Dwan. The film is also known as Star Dust and Sweet Music (American reissue title). The movie was written by Lee Loeb, Mary Loos, and Richard Sale, with a cast featuring Jane Frazee, William Marshall, Gail Patrick, Kenny Baker and Victor McLaglen.

This was Patrick's last film before retiring from acting in the wake of her marriage.

Plot 
The film tells the story of two best friends from Boston who come to Greenwich Village in 1900, one to become a famous artist, the other to become a famous composer. The composer falls in love with the girl next door, but she is intrigued by his friend, who has secrets he feels he doesn't need to share with her.

Cast 
Jane Frazee as Patricia O'Neill
William Marshall as Johnny Bennett
Gail Patrick as Olivia Radford
Kenny Baker as Byron Jones
Victor McLaglen as Matthew O'Neill
Irene Rich as Lulu Varden
James Ellison as Steve Adams
Janet Martin as Tessie
Franklin Pangborn as 'Dilly' Dillingsworth
Gus Schilling as Ed Gaskin
Charles Arnt as Capt. Olsen
Lou Nova as Clancy
Emory Parnell as The Mayor

External links 

1947 films
1947 musical comedy films
1940s romantic musical films
American romantic musical films
American black-and-white films
Films directed by Allan Dwan
Films set in the 1900s
Republic Pictures films
American musical comedy films
1940s English-language films
1940s American films